Condemned is a 1929 American black-and-white pre-Code melodrama, directed by Wesley Ruggles, and starring Ronald Colman, Ann Harding, Dudley Digges, Louis Wolheim, William Elmer, and Wilhelm von Brincken. The movie was adapted by Sidney Howard from the novel by Blair Niles.

Plot

Cast
 Ronald Colman - Michel
 Ann Harding - Madame Vidal
 Dudley Digges - Vidal
 Louis Wolheim - Jacques
 William Elmer - Pierre
 Wilhelm von Brincken - Vidal's orderly (as William Vaughn)
 Albert Kingsley - Felix
 Constantine Romanoff - Brute Convict
 Harry Ginsberg - Inmate
 Bud Sommers - Inmate
 Stephen Selznick - Inmate
 Baldy Biuddle - Inmate
 John George - Inmate
 John Schwartz - Inmate

Production background
This film was also released in a silent version running 9000 feet. In 1930, Colman was nominated for an Academy Award in the Acting category for his work in this film and in Bulldog Drummond (1929). Condemned was the first of eight films written by Sidney Howard for producer Samuel Goldwyn, the last of which was Raffles (1939).

Soundtrack
Note: this list is incomplete
 "Song of the Condemned" written by Jack Meskill and Pete Wendling

International releases
The film is known by a variety of other names, including: Condenado in Portugal and Spain, Condemned to Devil's Island in the USA reissue, Condenado a Isla del Diablo in Argentina, Flucht von der Teufelsinsel in Austria, and L'isola del diavolo in Italy.

References

External links
 
 Condemned at Cine.gr (in Greek)
 Condemned at TCMdb

American prison films
1929 films
American black-and-white films
American romantic drama films
Films directed by Wesley Ruggles
Films set on Devil's Island
Samuel Goldwyn Productions films
1929 romantic drama films
Melodrama films
1920s English-language films
1920s American films